The Shelby Lancer was a limited-production hatchback sports sedan based on the Dodge Lancer.  Modified by Carroll Shelby for 1987 and in Graphic Red only, the Shelby Lancer was intended to be an American counterpart to such European sedans as the BMW 3 Series and Peugeot 405.  It was well equipped inside with many amenities not offered on the normal Lancer, including a special 10-speaker Pioneer CD audio system, one of the first Compact Disc systems offered in an American car. There were only 800 of these cars made in total; 400 came with a 3-speed Automatic transmission (A413) and leather interior, and 400 with a 5-speed Manual transmission (A520) and cloth interior. Other Shelby-branded items included a numbered plaque attached to the dashboard along with Shelby 15 inch wheels, a Shelby steering wheel, and a Shelby valve cover. The various VIN plates and build labels on the car all indicated "Shelby Automobiles" instead of the typical Chrysler or Dodge labels found on normal production vehicles.

Power came from a Chrysler supplied, Shelby tuned Turbo II 2.2 Liter Intercooled SOHC I4, with 175 hp (130 kW) and 175 ft·lbf (237 Nm). Weight was just over 3,000 lb (1,360 kg) with the average driver, so performance was not as good as the lighter and lesser-equipped Shelby GLHS.
 
Road handling was quite good for a sedan at the time, pulling an advertised 0.85 g on the skidpad. Ride comfort was stiff but not unbearable, providing a good balance between a sport suspension coupe and a touring sedan. Goodyear Gatorback tires, Monroe Formula GP struts and larger sway bars were used to provide a firmer suspension with better grip. Shelby also used an experimental (at the time) 4-wheel disc brake system to improve braking.

Dodge carried on the car with the 1988 and 1989 Lancer Shelby, which is not to be confused with the true Shelby car which was assembled in Whittier, California. The Dodge version is actually more rare despite being factory produced but wasn't numbered and had different Shelby-specific parts.

Notes

References
Minick, D. and Zatz, D. The Dodge Lancer and Chrysler LeBaron GTS. Retrieved 27 April 2012 from Allpar.com/model/lancer.html.

Lancer
Front-wheel-drive sports cars
Mid-size cars
Hatchbacks
1980s cars